Adam and Evil (also known as Halloween Camp 2: Scream If You Wanna Die Faster in the United Kingdom) is a 2004 American slasher film directed by Andrew Van Slee. It stars Erica Cerra, James Clayton, and Jodie Graham. The plot follows a group of friends who are stalked and murdered by a masked killer during a camping trip.

Filming for Adam and Evil began on April 30, 2003 in Los Angeles and was released on April 27, 2004.

Although there is no plot continuity, the UK name implies a sequel to 2003's Bloody Murder 2: Closing Camp, released as Halloween Camp in the UK. This in turn is a sequel to 2000's Bloody Murder in the US.

Premise

A young group of friends head out to the woods for fun and frolics, but soon find themselves embroiled in a deadly game of cat and mouse with a masked killer.

Cast

Critical response
Adam and Evil was criticized for its lack of originality at Rotten Tomatoes.
One reviewer concluded: "I realize it's not as awful as I first thought it was ... I did find myself laughing a lot at all the bad acting".
Another said "If you love mindless slashers where the plot is so simple Bullwinkle J. Moose could figure it out in record time, and the kids are dumber than the norm, then check out "Adam and Evil". Trust me you will not be disappointed".

Referring to the U.K. title, Andrew Smith says "devoid of everything that makes this genre such a predictably entertaining time, you'll want to die faster if you are unlucky enough to sit down to watch".
The critic Timothy Gross comments that "this almost bloodless lame attempt at a slasher movie is horrible...", awarding it 1/2 star.

References

Further reading

2004 films
2004 horror films
American slasher films
2000s English-language films
2000s American films
2000s slasher films